Patala in Indian religions denotes the subterranean realms of the universe.
 
Patala may also refer to:

 Patala, Uttar Pradesh, a town in India
Regio Patalis, the region of Patala, derived from the ancient city of Patala at the mouth of the Indus River in Pakistan

See also
Patla (disambiguation)